Epilycus was an Athenian comic poet of the Old Comedy. He is mentioned by an ancient grammarian in connection with Aristophanes and Philyllius. Of his play Kôraliskos, a few fragments are preserved.

An epic poet of the same name, a brother of the comic poet Crates, is mentioned in the Suda.

References

Footnotes

Old Comic poets
Ancient Athenians